Liam Matthew Farrell (born 2 July 1990) is an English rugby league footballer who plays as a  or  for the Wigan Warriors in the Super League, and has played for the England Knights and England at international level.

He has spent time on loan from Wigan at the Widnes Vikings in the Championship.

Background
Farrell was born in Wigan, Greater Manchester, England. His younger brother Connor Farrell played for Wigan. He is a distant cousin of former Wigan captain Andy Farrell.

Career
Farrell started the 2010 season on a dual registration loan at Widnes. He made a try scoring home début against Barrow.  Wigan Head Coach Michael Maguire gave Farrell his Wigan first team début in the victory over Wakefield Trinity on 5 April, coming off the bench and scoring a try.

He played in the 2010 Super League Grand Final victory over St. Helens at Old Trafford.

Farrell played from the substitutes' bench in the 2011 Challenge Cup Final victory over Leeds at Wembley Stadium.

Farrell played in the 2013 Challenge Cup Final victory over Hull F.C. at Wembley Stadium.

Farrell played in the 2013 Super League Grand Final victory over Warrington at Old Trafford.

He played in the 2014 Super League Grand Final defeat by St. Helens at Old Trafford.
Farrell played in the 2015 Super League Grand Final defeat by Leeds at Old Trafford.
Farrell played in the 2016 Super League Grand Final victory over the Warrington club at Old Trafford.
Farrell played in the 2017 Challenge Cup Final defeat by Hull F.C. at Wembley Stadium.
Farrell played in the 2018 Super League Grand Final victory over Warrington at Old Trafford.

Farrell played in the 2020 Super League Grand Final which Wigan lost 8-4 against St Helens.
On 28 May 2022, Farrell played for Wigan in their 2022 Challenge Cup Final win over Huddersfield.

International career
Farrell played in the Rugby League World Cup warm up match v Italy at Salford on 19 October 2013 when England were beaten 15-14, and figured for England in the Rugby League World Cup matches in October & November 2013.

Farrell played for England in the 2014 Four Nations. He featured in all of England's tournament games and also scored his first international try for England in the opening game against Samoa.

In October 2015, Farrell was selected in the England team for their test series against New Zealand. Before the series began England played a test match against France. Farrell scored a try in England's rout of their opponents.

In October 2016, Farrell was selected in the 24-man England squad for the 2016 Four Nations tournament.

References

External links
Wigan Warriors profile
Liam Farrell Statistics at wigan.rlfans.com
SL profile
Profile at wiganwarriors.com

1990 births
Living people
England Knights national rugby league team players
England national rugby league team players
English people of Irish descent
English rugby league players
Liam
Rugby league players from Wigan
Rugby league second-rows
Widnes Vikings players
Wigan Warriors captains
Wigan Warriors players